Justin Lewis is a software designer and entrepreneur, and one of the founders of NationalField, a software company that makes private social networks.

Early life and education
Justin Terrell Lewis was born on March 20, 1986 in Douglas, Georgia. He graduated from Coffee High School and enrolled at Valdosta State University as a computer science major. He left VSU in 2008 while working on the presidential campaign of then-senator Barack Obama.

Career
Lewis's work with the Obama campaign led him to meet Aharon Wasserman and Edward Saatchi. The three co-founded NationalField, an enterprise social network company, to more easily keep track of campaign data and coordinate communications between managers, staff, and volunteers. He currently serves as the company's Chief Technology Officer. In 2011, Lewis was named in Forbes magazine's 30 Under 30. Prior to leaving VSU, Justin worked at the school's IT department.

References

External links
http://valdostadailytimes.com/local/x205476487/VSU-dropout-named-to-Forbes-30-Under-30
http://www.walb.com/story/16400830/douglas-man-honored-by-forbes

1986 births
Living people
American computer programmers
American chief technology officers